Østmarka Hospital or Nidaros District Psychiatric Center (Nidaros DPS) is a psychiatric hospital in Lade, Trondheim. Nidaros DPS is supposed to replace the earlier Leistad District Psychiatric Center. It serves the boroughs of Lerkendal, Østbyen, Midtbyen of Trondheim, as well as Malvik. Østmarka Hospital is part of St. Olav's Hospital Trust.

History 
On March 19, 2007, the departments Haukåsen and Østmarka joined, forming one acute department for the psychiatric health at St. Olav's University Hospital.

Building 
The building consists of four flats with basement. Plan 1, 2 and 3 consists all of polyclinic and daycare. Plan 2 also consists of polyclinic and Plan 3 is an activity apartment. Plan 0 consists of technical areas and wardrobes, and Plan 4 of a canteen and a kitchen.

Location 
The southside borders to a big field and the northeast continues down to the sea. There is also housing on Østmarka. The locating is planned to get a combination of private zones for the patients and zones available for the public.

References

Psychiatric hospitals in Norway
Buildings and structures in Trondheim